Hans Valla (born 1 May 1909) was an Austrian male former weightlifter, who competed in the middleweight class and represented Austria at international competitions. He won the bronze medal at the 1937 World Weightlifting Championships in the 75 kg category. He also competed at the 1936 Summer Olympics.

References

External links

1909 births
Year of death missing
Austrian male weightlifters
World Weightlifting Championships medalists
Place of birth missing
Olympic weightlifters of Austria
Weightlifters at the 1936 Summer Olympics
20th-century Austrian people